Resty Nanziri (born 1997 or 1998) is a Ugandan footballer who plays as a forward for FUFA Women Super League club Kampala Queens FC and the Uganda women's national team.

Club career
Nanziri has played for Kampala Queens in Uganda.

International career
Nanziri capped for Uganda at senior level during the 2021 COSAFA Women's Championship.

International goals
Scores and results list Uganda goal tally first

References

External links

1990s births
Living people
Sportspeople from Kampala
Ugandan women's footballers
Women's association football forwards
Uganda women's international footballers